The 17th Marine Regiment was a composite engineer regiment of the United States Marine Corps subordinate to the 1st Marine Division. It was formed primarily from units of the Division, and was inactivated during war with the 1st and 2nd battalions remaining in the Division.

Subordinate units
The regiment a composite of  three different types of battalions and a headquarters and service company:

 1st Battalion, 17th Marines, A, B, & C Company 1st Engineer Battalion, now 1st Combat Engineer Battalion
 2nd Battalion, 17th Marines, D, E, & F Companies 1st Pioneer Battalion, now 1st Landing Support Battalion
 3rd Battalion, 17th Marines, G, H, & I Companies 19th Naval Construction Battalion

History

World War II

The 17th Marine Regiment participated in the Battle of Cape Gloucester. The subordinate battalions, as independent battalions in 1st Marine Division, participated in all of the Division's major operations during the war.  According to the 19th CB's log it was assigned to the 1st Marine 11/05/42 prior to leaving the States.  On 04/03/43 "By Division General Order No. 74 of 3 Apr'43 - First Marine Division:  the 19th CBs designation will be as follow's in the future, when  attached to First Marine Div., Fleet Marine Force ----3rd Battalion, 17th Marines (Engineers) c/o FPO San Francisco. Calif." The 19th was "at Cape Gloucester from 27 Dec 43 until 4 May 44" and remained with the 1st Division until "1 Jul'44 when The 19th CB was detached from the operational control of the 1st MarDiv, re-designated the 19th NCB and transferred to the 3rd Marine Amphibious Corps.

The 19th had a MM1 Chester J. Perkins who was flight qualified.  The Seabees got ahold of a light observation aircraft that MM1 Perkins logged 218 hrs in, of which 105 were combat.  He flew spotter for the 11th Marine Regiment  as well as dropped urgent medical supplies and rations to forward troops.  In recognition of his contributions to the assault he was awarded the Navy Air Medal.

note: when the 19th CB was assigned to the Marine Corps 11/05/42 it lost one company and 1/4 of Hq Co.  Those men were assigned to the Fleet Marine Force replacement group (as the 19th replacement group).  That group would form the core of the 121st CB  which would become the 3rd Battalion, 20th Marines (Engineers).

Unit awards
Headquarters Company PUC 7Aug-9Dec42 SU 1st MarDiv 
Company D PUC 7Aug-9Dec42 SU 1st MarDiv
Company E PUC 7Aug-9Dec42 SU 1st MarDiv
Company F PUC 7Aug-9Dec42 SU 1st MarDiv

See also

 History of the United States Marine Corps
 List of United States Marine Corps regiments
 Organization of the United States Marine Corps
 1st Marine Division
 16th Marine Regiment(Engineer)
 18th Marine Regiment(Engineer)
 19th Marine Regiment(Engineer)
 20th Marine Regiment(Engineer)
 Seabees

References

External links

http://www.ibiblio.org/hyperwar/USMC/USMC-M-NBrit/USMC-M-NBrit-VII.html
Pacific War Online Encyclopedia:  Cape Gloucester
Marines in World War II- the Campaign on New Britain, Lt. Col Robert D. Heinl Jr. & Lt. Col. John A. Croon, Pickle Partners Publishing, Appendix IV - Shore Party

Eng17
Eng17
United States Marine Corps in World War II
Military units and formations established in 1942
1942 establishments in the United States